Al-Balad is the historical area of Jeddah, the second largest city of Saudi Arabia. Balad can literally be translated as "The Town." Balad is the historic center of the City of Jeddah.

Al-Balad was founded in the 7th century and historically served as the centre of Jeddah. Al-Balad's defensive walls were torn down in the 1940s. In the 1970s and 1980s, when Jeddah began to become wealthier due to the oil boom, many Jeddawis moved north, away from Al-Balad, as it reminded them of less prosperous times. Al-Balad had insufficient parking space for large cars. Its stores did not sell expensive designer clothing. Poor immigrants moved in place of the Saudi population. The municipality of Jeddah began historical preservation efforts in the 1970s. In 1991 the Municipality of Jeddah founded the Jeddah Historical Preservation Society to preserve the historical architecture and culture of Al-Balad. In 2002, US$4 million were earmarked for the preservation society. In 2009, Al-Balad was nominated by Saudi Commission for Tourism and Antiquities to be added to UNESCO's World Heritage list, and it was accepted in 2014.

In order to preserve the old structures within Al-Balad, the Historical Area Preservation Department was established in 1990, hoping also to help promoting cultural tourism in the country. The Saudi Crown Prince, Muhammad bin Salman, pledged $13.33 million to restore the old city in Jeddah as there were 56 buildings in urgent need of repair.

Many Jeddawis had moved away from Al-Balad by 2007; the streets of Balad were still packed with people during the month of Ramadan. Around that year the Jeddah Urban Development Company was formed to restore Al-Balad.

Historical neighborhoods 
Al-Balad is mainly divided into number of different districts:

 Al-Sham neighborhood: Located in the northern part of Al-Balad which includes this neighborhood Dar al-Sarti and Dar al-Zahid.
 Al-Yemen neighborhood: Located in the southern part of Al-Balad south of Al-Alawi Street and gained its name towards the country of Yemen , it includes Dar Al-Nassif, Dar Al-Jumjum, Dar Al-Shaarawi and Dar Al-Abdul-Samad.
 Al-Bahr neighborhood: Located in the south-western part of Jeddah, overlooking the sea and the Dar Al-Radwan House, known at the time as the Radwan of Sea.

Historical houses 
Among the most famous and oldest buildings to date are the Al Nassif House and Al Jamjoom House in Yemen neighborhood, Al Baeshen House, Al Qabal Mosque, Al Shafi'i Mosque in Al Mazloum, Dar Al Banaja and Al Zahed Houses in the Al Sham neighborhood. Some of these buildings have risen to more than 30 meters. Their construction is still in good condition after decades.

Jeddah Old City is a home for 500-year-old buildings that are now subject to restoration as the Saudi crown prince Muhammad bin Salman pledged an amount of $13.3 million to restore 56 buildings. The restoration project will be implemented by the Ministry of Culture. The aim of the project is to boost the artistic culture in Saudi Arabia.

Non–Muslim Cemetery
The Non–Muslim Cemetery (formerly known as the Christian Cemetery) is located on the King Fahd Branch Road in Al-Balad. The cemetery is hidden from sight by a wall and high trees. The supervision of the site is the responsibility of Western consulates in Jeddah.

The cemetery contains more than 400 graves, including a sarcophagus dedicated to the French explorer Charles Huber and a single Commonwealth War Graves Commission gravestone for a British soldier of the Second World War. Cyril Ousman, the British Vice-consul of Jeddah who was shot and killed by Prince Mishari bin Abdulaziz Al Saud is also buried here. Recent burials have been rare and infrequent, and are mostly of Indian and Filipino children.

The cemetery has existed since the 16th century when it was used to bury Portuguese casualties resulting from the Ottoman–Portuguese wars. The walls of the cemetery may have been built by Muhammad Ali of Egypt in the aftermath of the Ottoman-Saudi wars of the 1810s. The cemetery was vandalised following the Battle of Jeddah in 1925.

Gallery

“Misk Historic Jeddah” Initiative 

It is an annual event that takes place at Jeddah's historical area. The main aim of the event is to highlight the historical and cultural significance of AL-Balad. During the event, visitors walk through the old streets and alleys. Moreover, the initiative organizes a number of traditional entertainment activities for kids and adults. Being part of the Jeddah Season touristic festival 2019, AL-Balad hosted a number of events, all of which are organized under the title " Kanz Al-Balad". Kanz AL-Balad is a scavenger hunt in which participants are asked to find particular places or objects. Along the game, participants can enjoy attending more than 41 shows and plays in the area.

Notes

References
 Bradley, John R. Saudi Arabia Exposed: Inside a Kingdom in Crisis. Palgrave Macmillan. 2005.

External links 

 جده التاريخيه ثلاثية الابعاد (jeddah albalad 3d model)

Neighbourhoods in Jeddah
Arabic architecture